Krasnaya Orlovka is a rural locality (a selo) in Chesnokovsky Selsoviet of Mikhaylovsky District, Amur Oblast, Russia. The population was 129 as of 2018. There are 5 streets.

Geography 
Krasnaya Orlovka is located on the left bank of the Amur River, 10 km southeast of Poyarkovo (the district's administrative centre) by road. Shadrino is the nearest rural locality.

References 

Rural localities in Mikhaylovsky District, Amur Oblast